The 1942 United States Senate election in Iowa took place on November 3, 1942. Incumbent Democratic Senator Clyde Herring ran for re-election to a second term but was defeated by Republican Governor George A. Wilson.

Democratic primary

Candidates
Clyde Herring, incumbent Senator since 1937 and former Governor
Ernest J. Seemann, perennial candidate

Results

After losing the primary, Seemann entered the general election on the "Progressive New Dealer" ticket.

Republican primary

Candidates
G. Scott Davies
James I. Dolliver, member of the Fort Dodge Board of Education, former County Attorney for Webster County, and nephew of former Senator Jonathan P. Dolliver
Mark G. Thornburg, Iowa Secretary of Agriculture since 1939
George A. Wilson, Governor of Iowa since 1939

Results

General election

Results

See also 
 1942 United States Senate elections

References 

1942
Iowa
United States Senate